Paso Ancho is a corregimiento in Tierras Altas District, Chiriquí Province, Panama. It was established by Law 55 of September 13, 2013.

Climate
Paso Ancho has a subtropical highland climate (Cwb) with moderate to little rainfall from December to April and heavy to very heavy rainfall from May to November.

References

Corregimientos of Chiriquí Province